The Spanish National Badminton Championships is a tournament organized by the Federación Española de Bádminton to crown the best badminton players in Spain.

The tournament started in 1982 and is held every year.

Past winners

Successful players
Below is the list of the most ever successful players in the Spanish National Badminton Championships:

References
Historic Archive on Spanish Badminton Federation

 

Recurring sporting events established in 1982
National badminton championships